"So Much Love to Give" is a 2002 single released by French house duo Together, consisting of Thomas Bangalter and DJ Falcon. It experienced widespread success in 2005 when sampled by British duo Freeloaders.

The 12-inch single was released without a B-side. The song contains a sample of "Love's Such a Wonderful Thing" by the Real Thing. Together used the caption repeatedly throughout the song rather than being a one-liner as in the case of the Real Thing song.

Track listing
"So Much Love to Give" – 10:43

Charts

Freeloaders version

A sample of "So Much Love to Give" was prominently used by British duo Freeloaders for their 2005 single also titled "So Much Love to Give". It was mastered at Propaganda Productions by Guy Lenzer and publishing by Sony Music. The song reached number nine on the UK Singles Chart and peaked within the top 50 in Flemish Belgium, Germany, Ireland and the Netherlands.

Track listing
 "So Much Love to Give" (radio edit) – 3:06
 "So Much Love to Give" (extended mix) – 7:14
 "So Much Love to Give" (Morjac remix) – 6:12
 "So Much Love to Give" (Kenny Hayes remix) – 7:06
 "So Much Love to Give" (Basscore mix) – 7:11
 "So Much Love to Give" (Milk & Sugar remix) – 8:04
 "So Much Love to Give" (Freefunkt mix) – 6:36

The EP also included the music video for the song.

Charts

Weekly charts

Year-end charts

Covers and adaptations
In 2011, Dutch house DJ and record producer Fedde Le Grand used the sample in his release amended as "So Much Love" on Universal Music. In 2016, the Hungarian DJs and record producers Muzzaik and Stadiumx used the sample in their song "So Much Love" on Spinnin' Records.

References

2002 songs
2002 singles
2005 debut singles
French house songs
All Around the World Productions singles
Song recordings produced by Thomas Bangalter
Songs written by Thomas Bangalter